Der Club (The Club) is a weekly Swiss television talk show, aired since 1985 by Schweizer Radio und Fernsehen on Tuesday. It was called Zischtigsclub (Tuesday Club) until 2005. The format is an adaptation of the Austrian . It is dedicated to current social and political themes. Occasionally, it has discussed themes related to the media as Medienclub. Several times a year, it is held as Literaturclub, focused on books.

History and format

Der Club 
The format has been presented since 1985 on SRF 1. For around 80 minutes, a current topic is discussed, most often by six people from different backgrounds, with a focus on the relevance for society. The discussion is held in the local dialect. The first topic was "No Future". The atmosphere is reminiscent of a lounge (de). The format was first called Zischtigsclub, a name kept until 2005 and still used colloquially.

Leaders of the staff have included:
  (to 1990)
  (to 2006)
 Christine Maier (to 2011)
  (since 2011)

Medienclub 
Since May 2013, Der Club has occasionally been dedicated to topics from the media and presented as Medienclub. In this format, it was first aired on 28 May 2013, under the title "Sind Medien Terrorhelfer?" (Do the media help terrorism?) and discussed the role of the media in the murder of Lee Rigby.  The format was aired only a few times, but was revived on 10 November 2015, with presenter  and four guests, discussing "Ohnmächtige Vierte Gewalt, wenn das Publikum die Medien dirigiert".

Literaturclub 
Since 1990, Der Club has been replaced eight to ten times each year by the Literaturclub, devoted to literature. The discussions in this format are not in Swiss dialect but in standard German. The talks take around 75 minutes, focused on books, and involve a presenter, one often prominent guest and two professional literary critics. All participants may suggest a book. In the first airing in this format, Andreas Isenschmid, who had designed the format, Iso Camartin and presenter  appeared. Other critics who shaped the format have included ,  and Peter Hamm.

The Literaturclub series was held at a bookstore of Orell Füssli, which sponsored it from 2006. Beginning in 2008, it was sponsored by the Thalia bookstore. From 2010, the format was aired from the Papiersaal at the Sihlcity in Zürich.

Since September 2014, the Literaturclub has been presented by Nicola Steiner, with critics including , Elke Heidenreich, Milo Rau, Rüdiger Safranski,  and Philipp Tingler. The broadcast has been repeated by 3sat on one of the following Sundays.

References

External links 
 Club 
 Literaturclub srf.ch 
 Literaturclub ARD 
 Besuch beim Schweizer Literaturclub: Elke Heidenreich und Nicola Steiner im Interview literaturcafe.de, September 2016 
 

Swiss television shows
Television talk shows
1985 Swiss television series debuts
1980s Swiss television series
1990s Swiss television series
2000s Swiss television series
2010s Swiss television series
2020s Swiss television series
Schweizer Radio und Fernsehen original programming